William Dyet (born 1931) is a Scottish international lawn bowler.

Bowls career
He competed in the first World Bowls Championship in Kyeemagh, New South Wales, Australia in 1966  and won a bronze medal in the fours with Willie Adrain, Bert Thomson and Harry Reston at the event.

He is a five times national champion having won the 1964, 1971 and 1975 fours titles, the 1972 pairs title and the 1990 triples at the Scottish National Bowls Championships when bowling for the Balerno Bowls Club.

Personal life
He was a refrigeration engineer by trade. He took up bowls aged 15.

References

1931 births
Living people
Scottish male bowls players